Onda Verde (Portuguese for "green wave") is a municipality in the northern part of the state of São Paulo, Brazil. The population is 4,422 (2020 est.) in an area of 242.3 km². The city belongs to the Microregion of São José do Rio Preto.

References

External links
  http://www.ondaverde.sp.gov.br
  citybrazil.com.br

Municipalities in São Paulo (state)